Tony O'Callaghan (born 16 June 1956) is an English television actor. His most notable role is that of Sergeant Matt Boyden on the British television series The Bill from 1991 to 2003. He had previously appeared as a villain in The Bill in 1989 (S05E81, A Matter of Trust).

Career
In addition to his role on The Bill, he has also appeared in the television series The Magnificent Evans, Family Affairs, Holby City Doctors, EastEnders, Shameless, Three Up, Two Down, The Upper Hand and The Coven (in 2014).

In 2007, O'Callaghan appeared in the UK "Let It Out" Kleenex television advertisement.

He also appeared in the Irish television soap opera Fair City on RTÉ One, where he played the character Father Thaddeus, a British priest living in Dublin, Ireland, and who is having a relationship with a female character. In 2013, he joined the cast of EastEnders, playing Ollie Walters. O'Callaghan said of his casting: "I am very excited to be joining a show with as much prestige as EastEnders and I'm looking forward to portraying the nice side and humour of Ollie". He played the role on a recurring basis until 2016. On 10 June 2018, it was announced that O'Callaghan would make a "brief return" to EastEnders.

O'Callaghan has also appeared in several plays.

References

External links

Living people
1956 births
English male soap opera actors
English people of Irish descent
Male actors from London